La Nueva Cuba (LNC) is the first independent Cuban daily online newspaper, founded on November 1, 1998. LNC started as a weekly online newspaper until it turned daily in January 1999. LNC is published by the Independent Press Info Group Corporation - a non-profit incorporated in Washington, D.C.

External links
 LaNuevaCuba.com - official online version of La Nueva Cuba
 Newspaper Index - Most important Online Newspapers in every country

Notes

Cuban news websites
Internet properties established in 1998